The Chicago Kid is a 1945 American crime film directed by Frank McDonald and written by Jack Townley and Albert Beich. The film stars Don "Red" Barry, Otto Kruger, Tom Powers, Lynne Roberts, Henry H. Daniels Jr. and Chick Chandler. The film was released on June 29, 1945, by Republic Pictures.

Plot

Cast  
Don "Red" Barry as Joe Ferrill 
Otto Kruger as John Mitchell
Tom Powers as Mike Thurber
Lynne Roberts as Chris Mitchell
Henry H. Daniels Jr. as Bill Mitchell 
Chick Chandler as Squeak
Joseph Crehan as Chief Rogers
Jay Novello as Pinky
Paul Harvey as Carter
Addison Richards as The Warden
Kenne Duncan as Al

References

External links 
 

1945 films
American crime films
1945 crime films
Republic Pictures films
Films directed by Frank McDonald
1940s English-language films
1940s American films